Yoo Chan-wook (born April 27, 2000), known professionally as Be'O (stylized in all caps), is a South Korean rapper and songwriter. He first garnered attention when he appeared on the rap competition TV show Show Me the Money 10 in 2021.

Be'O signed to hip hop record label FameUs Entertainment in 2020 where he released the single albums Monster (2020) and Bipolar (2021). In 2021, he released the single "Counting Stars", which peaked at number one on the Gaon Digital Chart.

Early life and education 
Yoo Chan-wook was born on April 27, 2000, in Jongno-gu, Seoul, South Korea. He became interested in hip hop after watching Show Me the Money 3. When he was in the third grade of middle school, he decided to pursue a career in music. He graduated from School of Performing Arts Seoul and took part in season 3 of High School Rapper.

He adopted the stage name "Be'O" from his Christian name Pio.

Career

2020–2021: Signing to FameUs Entertainment and Show Me the Money 10 
In early 2020, Be'O signed to FameUs Entertainment, a hip hop label founded by rapper San E. He released the compilation albums God FameUs and Famous FameUs with labelmates San E, Errday, and Malkey in April and August respectively. In September 2020, he released his debut single Monster.

In May 2021, he released the single Bipolar. In October 2021, he appeared on the rap competition TV show Show Me the Money 10 where he gained popularity. "Breathe" and "Limousine", the singles he released on the show, both peaked at number 1 on the Gaon Digital Chart. He also released the singles "MBTI", "Without You", and "Nothing" and finished in third place. In December 2021, he released the single "Counting Stars" featuring rapper Beenzino, which peaked at number 1 on the Gaon Digital Chart.

2022: Signing to BPM Entertainment and Five Senses 
On March 8, 2022, it was announced that Be'O will be co-managed by FameUs and BPM Entertainment. In the same month, he became the brand ambassador of Kappa. He released his debut extended play Five Senses on September 29, 2022.

Artistry
Be'O pursues "music that makes people who do not know me at all imagine me". In an interview with The Single, he said that the live performance of "Stay" by Justin Bieber and The Kid Laroi always gives him inspiration.

Discography

Extended plays

Compilation albums

Singles

As lead artist

As featured artist

Filmography

Television shows

Awards and nominations

Notes

References

External links
 
 

2000 births
Living people
People from Seoul
Rappers from Seoul
School of Performing Arts Seoul alumni
Show Me the Money (South Korean TV series) contestants
South Korean male rappers